Rick Iversen is a retired American soccer defender who played professionally in the American Professional Soccer League and USISL.

Youth
In 1987, Iversen, in his only season with the San Diego State University men's soccer team, went to the final of the 1987 NCAA Division I Men's Soccer Championship.  He then transferred to California State University, Northridge.  In December 1988, Iversen scored the game-winning goal to put CSUN into the NCAA Division II Men's Soccer Championship final where they fell to Florida Tech.  He was the 1988 NCAA Division II Defensive MVP.  In addition to playing collegiate soccer, Iversen also spent two seasons with the San Diego Nomads in the Western Soccer Alliance (1986-1987).  In 1988, he played for the Los Angeles Heat.

Professional
On April 26, 1989, Iversen turned professional with the Victoria Vistas of the Canadian Soccer League.  In 1990, he moved to Europe to play for AaB Aalborg.  Iversen was back in the United States in 1991 to play for the Miami Freedom of the American Professional Soccer League.  In 1992, he returned to California where he would spend the rest of his career.  He began by joining the San Francisco Bay Blackhawks. In 1994, he played for the Silicon Valley Firebirds in the USISL.  In 1996, Iversen signed with the San Jose Clash of Major League Soccer.  He never played for the Clash, but went on loan to the Reno Rattlers.  On October 2, 1996, the Clash waived Iversen.  In 1997 and 1998, Iversen finished his career with the California Jaguars.

References

Living people
AaB Fodbold players
American soccer players
American expatriate soccer players
American Professional Soccer League players
Cal State Northridge Matadors men's soccer players
California Jaguars players
Canadian Soccer League (1987–1992) players
Los Angeles Heat players
Miami Freedom players
Reno Rattlers players
San Diego State Aztecs men's soccer players
Nomads Soccer Club players
San Francisco Bay Blackhawks players
USISL players
Willamette Valley Firebirds players
Victoria Vistas players
Western Soccer Alliance players
Association football defenders
Year of birth missing (living people)